Egyptian Ra is a Hong Kong based Thoroughbred racehorse. In the season of 2008-2009, Cruz, the trainer, had improved this seven-year-old an improbable 16 points from a mark of 110 to 126 on the ratings list and a place among the world's best thoroughbreds with an international rating of 119. Egyptian Ra also is one of the nominees of Hong Kong Horse of the Year.

References
 The Hong Kong Jockey Club – Egyptian Ra Racing Record
 The Hong Kong Jockey Club

Racehorses trained in Hong Kong
Hong Kong racehorses
Racehorses bred in New Zealand
Thoroughbred family C23